Cercottes is a commune in the Loiret department in north-central France. Cercottes station has rail connections to Orléans, Étampes and Paris.

See also
Communes of the Loiret department

References

Communes of Loiret